The Gabrieli String Quartet is a well-known string quartet musical ensemble founded in 1966. It has a long residency association with Essex University, UK.

Personnel 
1st violin:
Kenneth Sillito (1966-1986)
 John Georgiadis (1986-1990)
Yossi Zivoni (1995-2000)

2nd violin:
Claire Simpson (1966-1969)
Brendan O'Reilly (1969-2015)

viola
Ian Jewel

cello
Keith Harvey

Origins and activities 
The foundation date of the Quartet is given as 1966 or 1967. It has toured to Europe, North America, the Far East and Australia. In UK it performs at Aldeburgh Festival, the City of London Festival and the Cheltenham Festival. It also performs every year in the Mostly Mozart Festival of the London Barbican Centre. The Quartet have been resident artists at Essex University since 1971. They have given world premieres of works by William Alwyn, Benjamin Britten, Alan Bush, Daniel Jones, Gordon Crosse, Nicholas Maw, Panufnik and John McCabe. They also gave the British premiere of the Sibelius piano quintet. They have made many recordings.

Keith Harvey, cellist of the quartet, died on 28 April 2017, aged 79.

Notes and references

External links 
 Kenneth Sillito profile; Kenneth Sillito discography
 Notice of Ian Jewell
 Notice of Keith Harvey
 Notice of Brendan O'Reilly

English string quartets
Musical groups established in 1966
1966 establishments in England